The 1908 Dewsbury by-election was held on 23 April 1908.  The by-election was held due to the incumbent Liberal MP, Walter Runciman being appointed President of the Board of Education.  It was retained by Runciman.

History

Result

References

1908 elections in the United Kingdom
1908 in England
1900s in Yorkshire
April 1908 events
Elections in Kirklees
Dewsbury
By-elections to the Parliament of the United Kingdom in West Yorkshire constituencies
Ministerial by-elections to the Parliament of the United Kingdom